Luis Aldunate Carrera (March 3, 1842 – April 3, 1908) was a Chilean lawyer who served as minister of finance (1881–1882) and minister of foreign affairs (1882–1884). He was a member of the Chamber of Deputies of Chile (1876–1885) and Senate of Chile (1885–1891).

He was the son of Ambrosio Aldunate Carvajal and Rosa Carrera Fontecilla and his material grandparents were José Miguel Carrera and Mercedes Fontecilla.

Bibliography
 Castillo Infante, Fernando; Lía Cortés y Jordi Fuentes (1996). Diccionario Histórico y Biográfico de Chile. Santiago de Chile: Editorial Zig-Zag. p 21.

References

External links
Reseña biográfica en el sitio de la Biblioteca del Congreso Nacional de Chile.

1842 births
1908 deaths
People from Santiago
Foreign ministers of Chile
Chilean Ministers of Finance
Members of the Chamber of Deputies of Chile
Members of the Senate of Chile
Recipients of the Order of Isabella the Catholic
Knights Grand Cross of the Order of Isabella the Catholic
19th-century Chilean lawyers
19th-century Chilean politicians
20th-century Chilean politicians